The Open Letter to the 16th National Congress of the Chinese Communist Party was a petition from political activists in the People's Republic of China which urged the Chinese Communist Party to introduce political reforms.

There were 192 signatories to the letter of  a letter in November 2002, which was posted on the Internet calling on the 16th National Congress of the Chinese Communist Party to introduce political reforms.

6 Demands
political rehabilitation of the 1989 pro-democracy movement
the right of political exiles to return from abroad
release Zhao Ziyang from house arrest and restore his political rights
the release of jailed political prisoners
ratification of the International Covenant on Political and Civil Rights
the holding of free elections
 
The Chinese authorities reacted to its publication with an immediate clampdown and arrest of the more prominent political activists who had signed the letter.

The following notable co-signatories, He Depu, Jiang Lijun, Zhao Changqing, Ouyang Yi, Sang Jiancheng, Han Lifa, and Dai Xuezhong, have been tried for "subversion".

See also
Golden Shield Project
He Depu
Jiang Lijun

References

2002 in China
2002 in politics
Political history of China
Open letters
2002 documents